Xanthisma gracile is a species of annual flowering plant in the family Asteraceae known by the common names slender goldenweed and annual bristleweed.

Range and habitat
It is native the southwestern United States and northern Mexico, where it grows in the deserts and plateaus.

Growth pattern
It is a bristly annual herb growing erect up to 45 cm tall.

Leaves and stems
The oval or oblong leaves are 1–3 cm long and divided into lobes or teeth tipped with bristles.

Flowers and fruit
The inflorescence bears one or more flower heads lined with pointed, roughly hairy phyllaries. The head has a center of many yellow disc florets and a fringe of 16 to 18 yellow ray florets roughly a centimeter long. The fruit is a woolly achene 2 to 3 millimeters long tipped with a pappus.

Genetics
Xanthisma gracile has extra chromosomes that do not have any functional genes (B chromosomes), and about which little is known.

References

External links
Jepson Manual Treatment
USDA Plants Profile
Flora of North America
UC Photos gallery

Astereae
Flora of Mexico
Flora of the Western United States
Flora of the California desert regions
Taxa named by Thomas Nuttall
Plants described in 1848
Flora without expected TNC conservation status